Dedham Pottery was an American art pottery company opened by the Robertson Family in Dedham, Massachusetts during the American arts & crafts movement that operated between 1896 and 1943.  It was known for its high-fire stoneware characterized by a controlled and very fine crackle glaze with thick cobalt border designs.  The Chelsea Keramic Art Works (1872–1889) and "Chelsea Pottery U.S." (to 1895) were earlier companies of the family.

History

In 1876, family member Hugh C. Robertson visited the Centennial Exposition in Philadelphia - an early world’s fair - and viewed pottery from China with a blood-red crackled glaze that would inspire him to create his own version.  In 1867, the Robertson family founded their first company in Chelsea, Massachusetts on the corner of Marginal and Willow Streets, which subsequently became the Chelsea Keramic Art Works (CKAW) from 1872 to 1889, and then Chelsea Pottery U.S. (CPUS). The Boston Daily Globe reported on Monday, July, 30th 1894, that "about 10 acres of land at East Dedham, was sold for $6,500 to the Chelsea Pottery Company" and the pottery company would be moving from Chelsea to Dedham, "just as soon as proper buildings can be erected and other necessary work done."

Chelsea Pottery U.S. closed in 1895 and, just as promised, the company moved on to Dedham, Massachusetts  where Hugh C. Robertson, a fifth-generation Scottish potter, opened Dedham Pottery in 1896. The architect of the building, who also served on the company's board, was Alexander Wadsworth Longfellow Jr. The plant, which rarely if ever employed more than six people at a time, was located on Pottery Lane, off High Street, where the 2012 Avery School stands. The company closed in 1942 and the building burned to the ground in the 1970s. Maude Davenport, who was raised on Greenlodge Street in Dedham, is regarded as the company's most skilled decorator.

Patterns
The most common and recognizable design is a repeating crouching rabbit referred to as "the Dedham rabbit".  The rabbits crouch on the ground with their ears back and in between each rabbit stands a vegetable stalk which a former workman has claimed to be a Brussels sprout.  There are generally 10 rabbits in total and are spaced out evenly in a clockwise rotation.  The Dedham rabbit design had been drawn by Miss Alice Morse and J. Lindon Smith of the Museum of Fine Arts School in Boston. Other designs featured elephants, dolphins, polar bears, chicks, swans, turtles, ducks, butterflies, lilies, clover, and mushrooms.  During its span of production, Dedham Pottery created over fifty patterns for dinnerware and serving pieces.

Markings
1872–1889:  CKAW (Chelsea Keramic Art Works)
1892-1895: C.P.U.S. (Chelsea Pottery U.S.) impressed inside a clover leaf.
1896-1928: Square blue stamp with DEDHAM POTTERY printed over a rabbit; impressed foreshortened rabbit beneath.
1929-1943: REGISTERED added under standard Dedham Pottery stamp; two impressed foreshortened rabbits beneath.

Rarely the decorator would add his initials, a date, or the initials of the purchaser but these instances were rare and therefore, for collecting purposes, valuable.

Maude Rose Davenport a very skilled decorator at Dedham Pottery between 1904 and 1928 signed her work with a rebus, a small 5mm circle in the border of her designs.  Hugh C. Robertson sometimes signed his decorations with a square.

Reproductions
The Dedham Historical Society as well as another company in Concord, MA produces reproductions of Dedham pottery.  The Dedham Historical Society owns both the name and original trademark of Dedham Pottery. However, when making reproductions, the pottery is clearly labeled as such.

References

Works cited

External links 

American art pottery
Arts and Crafts movement
History of Dedham, Massachusetts
Companies based in Dedham, Massachusetts